Rhys Fawcett (born 9 October 1996) is a Welsh rugby union player who plays for Scarlets regional team as a prop.

Fawcett made his debut for the Scarlets regional team in 2016 having previously played for the Scarlets academy. In 2016 he was selected for the Wales U20 team for the 2016 World Rugby Under 20 Championship.

Rhys more recently went out on loan to the rivals Ospreys and faced his home club in the Boxing Day derby.

His hobbies are playing PlayStation and grafting.

References

External links 
Scarlets profile

1996 births
Living people
Rugby union players from Haverfordwest
Scarlets players
Welsh rugby union players
Dragons RFC players
Ospreys (rugby union) players
Rugby union props